Florida Kingsley was an actress on stage and screen in the United States. Her career lasted more than 40 years. She is in numerous films from the silent film era.

Theater
The Capitol (1895)

Selected filmography
The Turmoil (1916 film) as Mrs. Vertrees 
The Boy Girl (1917) as Agatha Channing 
Hidden Fires (1918 film) as Mrs. Treadway Parke 
The Woman on the Index (1919) as Mrs. Martin
Thou Shalt Not (film) (1919) as Ruth's Mother 
The Woman Under Oath (1919) as Mrs. O'Neil  
Youthful Folly (1920) as Aunt Martha
Dangerous Business (1920 film) as Mrs. Brooks 
Youthful Folly (1920 film) as Aunt Martha 
Greater Than Fame (1920) as Aunt Prudence (credited as Flora Kingsley) 
Annabell Lee (1921) as David's Mother, film based on Edgar Allan Poe's poem Annabel Lee. Extant. 
Is Life Worth Living? (1921) as Mrs. Grant
 Clay Dollars (1921) as Mrs. GordonThe Little Red Schoolhouse (1923 film)'' as Hired Girl

References

Year of birth missing (living people)
American stage actresses
American silent film actresses
20th-century American actresses